This is a list of United States ambassadors, or lower-ranking heads of a diplomatic mission to Iraq.
 Alexander K. Sloan (1931) – Chargé d'Affaires
 Paul Knabenshue (1932–1942) – Minister
 Thomas M. Wilson (1942) – Minister
 Loy W. Henderson (1943–1945) – Minister
 George Wadsworth II (1946–1948) – Minister
 Edward Savage Crocker II (1948) – First ambassador
 Burton Y. Berry (1952–1954)
 Waldemar J. Gallman (1954–1958)
 John D. Jernegan (1958–1962)
 Robert C. Strong (1963–1967)
 Enoch S. Duncan (1967) – Chargé d'Affaires

The United States broke off full ties with Iraq over the Six-Day War and did not resume them until 1984. The U.S. maintained an interests section starting in 1972, hosted by the Belgian embassy.
 David George Newton (1984–1988) – Initially Chargé d'Affaires, then full ambassador
 April Glaspie (1988–1990)
 Joseph C. Wilson (1990–1991) – Chargé d'Affaires until First Gulf War

The American embassy in Baghdad remained closed until 2000 when it was staffed by Japanese diplomats working in proxy with the U.S. No new Ambassador or Chargé d'Affaires was appointed until after the Second Gulf War. However the U.S. Interests Section was opened at the Polish embassy in January, 1991. The Polish embassy represented interests of the U.S. until July 13, 2004.
 Krzysztof Biernacki (1991–2004) – the Director of the U.S. Interests Section at the Polish embassy in Baghdad, Polish diplomat
 John Negroponte (2004–2005) – First post-Second Gulf War ambassador
 Zalmay Khalilzad (2005 – March 2007)
 Ryan Crocker (March 2007 – March 2009) Ambassador Patricia A. Butenis is Chargé d'Affaires, a.i.
 Christopher R. Hill (April 2009 – August 2010)
 James F. Jeffrey (August 2010 – June 2012)
 Robert S. Beecroft (September 2012 – June 2014)
 Stuart E. Jones (June 2014 – 2016)
 Douglas Silliman (2016 – February 2019)
 Joey R. Hood (February – June 2019) - Chargé d'Affaires
 Matthew H. Tueller (June 2019 – June 2022)
 Alina Romanowski (June 2022 – present)

See also
 Embassy of Iraq, Washington, D.C.
 Embassy of the United States, Baghdad
 Iraq–United States relations
 Foreign relations of Iraq
 Ambassadors of the United States

References

 United States Department of State: Background notes on Iraq

External links
 United States Department of State: Chiefs of Mission for Iraq
 United States Department of State: Iraq
 United States Embassy in Baghdad

Iraq
Main
United States